Veni, vidi, vici is a Latin phrase popularly attributed to Julius Caesar.

Veni vidi vici may also refer to:

Veni Vidi Vici (album), by The Forgotten, 1998
Veni Vidi Vici (TV series), a Swedish comedy web series
Veni Vidi Vici, a 2021 album by TRI.BE
"Veni Vidi Vici", a song by The Black Lips from Good Bad Not Evil
"Veni-Vidi-Vici", a song by The Gaylords
"Veni Vidi Vici", a song by Highland
"Veni Vidi Vici", a song by Madonna from Rebel Heart
”Veni, Vidi, Vici”, a song by Virgin Steele from their 1998 album, Invictus

See also
Venni Vetti Vecci, a 1999 album by Ja Rule
 Vini vidivici, an extinct species of parrot